OCGA  may refer to:
Official Code of Georgia Annotated
Ontario Charitable Gaming Association